Robots of the United States include simple household robots such as Roomba to sophisticated autonomous aircraft such as the MQ-9 Reaper that cost 18 million dollars per unit. The first industrial robot, robot company, and exoskeletons as well as the first dynamically balancing, organic, and nanoscale robots originate from the United States.

History

In 1898 Nikola Tesla publicly demonstrated a radio-controlled torpedo. Based on patents for "teleautomation", Tesla hoped to develop it into a weapon system for the US Navy.

In 1926, Westinghouse Electric Corporation created Televox, the first robot put to useful work. In the 1930s, they created a humanoid robot known as Elektro for exhibition purposes, including the 1939 and 1940 World's Fairs.

Unimate was the first industrial robot,
which worked on a General Motors assembly line in New Jersey in 1961.
It was created by George Devol in the 1950s using his original patents. Devol, together with Joseph F. Engelberger started Unimation, the world's first robot manufacturing company.

In 2008 the U.S. Air Force 174th Fighter Wing transitioned from F-16 piloted planes to MQ-9 Reaper drones, which are capable remote controlled or autonomous flight, becoming the first all-robot attack squadron.

Modern robots

Domestic

 PatrolBot a configurable guide/delivery/surveillance robot
 Roomba a vacuum cleaner
 Scooba a floor washer
 Looj a rain gutter cleaner

Entertainment
 iRobot Create

Extraterrestrial
 ATHLETE lunar rover
 Mars Exploration Rover

Medical

 Da Vinci Surgical System

Military (offensive/multi-role)

Aerial
 MQ-8 Fire Scout
 MQ-9 Reaper

Terrestrial
 Black Knight tank
 Gladiator
 MarkV-A1
 MULE / XM1219
 PackBot / SUGV
 TALON

Military (non-offensive)

Aerial
 RQ-4 Global Hawk
 RQ-7 Shadow
 RQ-14 Dragon Eye

Terrestrial
 ACER
 Battlefield Extraction-Assist Robot
 BigDog dynamically balancing quadruped
 Crusher
 Dragon Runner
 MATILDA

Nanoscale

 New York University walking DNA robot Smallest Robot: Science Videos - Science News - ScienCentral

Walker

 BigDog dynamically balancing quadruped
 Anybots Dexter, the first dynamically balancing biped 
 Timberjack Walking Machine logger

Non-autonomous (human operated)
These machines are human operated and not autonomous. Therefore, they do fit the classical description of a robot.

Exoskeleton

 Berkeley Lower Extremity Exoskeleton
 Sarcos/Raytheon XOS Exoskeleton, currently the most advanced exoskeleton, research for the XOS is funded by DARPA and NIST for use in the military and to "replace the wheelchair".

Military
 MQ-1 Predator

Research
 Tufts University morphing chemical robot Tufts to develop morphing 'chemical robots'

Software

 Microsoft Robotics Studio - .NET based
 VxWorks - operating system, notably used by ASIMO
 Robot App Store - Apps for every robot

American robotics companies
 Anybots
 Barrett Technology
 Berkshire Grey
 Bluefin Robotics
 Boston Dynamics
 Brooks Automation
Cobalt Robotics
Cobot Nation
Diligent Robotics
 Energid Technologies
 Evolution Robotics
Fetch Robotics
 Foster-Miller
 Harvest Automation
 Hydroid
 Intuitive Surgical
 iRobot
 Kiva Systems
Locus Robotics
 Mitsubishi Electric Automation - Robotics
 Myomo (myoelectric prosthetics)
 Rethink Robotics
Savioke
 Vecna Robotics
Vishwa Robotics
 Willow Garage

See also
 Japanese robotics
 Robots in warfare
 Shadow Hand British Robotics company
Underwater robot
Drone
Terminator, movie about and artificial intelligence

References

External links

 http://www.shadowrobot.com/